The Bristol Fairchild Bolingbroke is a maritime patrol aircraft and trainer used by the Royal Canadian Air Force during the Second World War. Built by Fairchild-Canada, it was a license-built version of the Bristol Blenheim Mk IV bomber.

Design and development
In 1935, the British Air Ministry issued Specification G.24/35 to procure a coastal reconnaissance/light bomber to replace the Avro Anson. Bristol proposed the Type 149, based on its Blenheim Mk I, with Bristol Aquila engines to give greater range. While the Air Ministry rejected this proposal, a Blenheim Mk I, retaining its Mercury VIII engines, was converted as a Type 149 (Blenheim Mk III) for the general reconnaissance role. The nose was lengthened to provide more room for the bombardier, with the upper left surface of the nose being scooped out to maintain pilot visibility during takeoff and landing.

The longer range also fulfilled a Canadian requirement for a maritime patrol aircraft. Consequently, Fairchild Aircraft Ltd. (Canada) of Quebec started production of the Blenheim Mk IV as the Bolingbroke (the originally intended name for the Blenheim IV). This type was nicknamed the "Bolly". After a small run of aircraft constructed to British specifications, as the Bolingbroke Mk I, Fairchild switched production to the Bolingbroke Mk IV with Canadian and American instruments and equipment. These versions also included anti-icing boots and a dinghy. One of the early Mk IV variants was the Bolingbroke Mk IVW which was powered by two 825 hp (615 kW) Pratt & Whitney SB4G Twin Wasp Junior engines. Incapable of maintaining altitude on one engine, the normal bomb load was reduced to 500 pounds on these aircraft to compensate for the low engine power. The most-produced variant was the Bolingbroke Mk IVT trainer, of which 457 were completed. A total of 626 Bolingbrokes were produced. The remains of one can be seen at the Lincolnshire Aviation Heritage Centre.

Operational history

Most of the 151 Mk IVs built served in their intended role as patrol bombers on the Atlantic and Pacific coasts of Canada between 1940 and 1944. Two squadrons of these aircraft also served in Alaska during the Aleutians campaign. The Mk IVT trainers saw extensive use in the British Commonwealth Air Training Plan (BCATP).

Variants
Bolingbroke Mk I
Twin-engine maritime patrol bomber aircraft, powered by two Bristol Mercury VIII radial piston engines, with British equipment. 18 built.
Bolingbroke Mk II
Conversion of fifth Mk I with US equipment - prototype of Mk IV.
Bolingbroke Mk III
Floatplane conversion of sixteenth Bolingbroke Mk I, with two Edo floats.
Bolingbroke Mk IV
Twin-engine maritime patrol bomber aircraft, equipped with anti-icing boots and a dinghy, also fitted with American and Canadian instruments and equipment, powered by two Bristol Mercury XV radial piston engines, 134 built.
Bolingbroke Mk IVW
Sub-version of Mk IV powered by two 825 hp (615 kW) Pratt & Whitney SB4G Twin Wasp Junior radial piston engines as contingency against possible shortages of Mercury engines.  The Mk IVW's performance was below that of the Mk IV and the supply of the British engines was maintained so production returned to the Mk IV after only 15 aircraft were built.
Bolingbroke Mk IVC
Version of Mk IV with 900 hp (671 kW) Wright R-1820 Cyclone engines not requiring high octane fuel. One built.
Bolingbroke Mk IVT
Multi-purpose trainer aircraft. A total of 350 built powered by Mercury XV engines, followed by a further 107 powered by the low-octane fuel Mercury XX* engine, giving a total of 457 built, with a further 51 cancelled. Six Mk IVT were converted to dual controls.  A further 89 were converted to Mk IVTT Target Tug with the addition of winching gear in the rear cabin and target drogue storage in the bomb bay.

Operators

 Royal Canadian Air Force
 Operational Squadrons of the Home War Establishment (HWE):
 No. 8 Squadron RCAF - Used Bolingbroke Mk I and Mk IV (Dec 40 – Aug 43)
 No. 115 Squadron RCAF - Used Bolingbroke Mk I (Aug 41 to Dec 41) and Mk IV (Nov 41 – Aug 43)
 No. 119 Squadron RCAF - Used Bolingbroke Mk I (Aug 40 - Aug 41), Mk IVW (Aug–Nov 41) and Mk IV (Nov 41 – Jun 42)
 No. 147 Squadron RCAF - Used Bolingbroke Mk I and Mk IV (Jul 42 – Mar 44)
 The following HWE squadrons only had small numbers of Bolingbrokes on strength:
 No. 13 (OT) Squadron RCAF - Used Bolingbroke Mk IV (Oct 41 – Jun 42)
 No. 121 (K) Squadron RCAF - Used Bolingbroke Mk IVTT (Target Tug) (Aug 42 – May 44)
 No. 122 (K) Squadron RCAF - Used Bolingbroke Mk IVTT (Target Tug) (Aug 42 – Sep 45)
 No. 163 (AC) Squadron RCAF - Used Bolingbroke Mk IV (Mar–Jun 43)
 (BR)-Bomber Reconnaissance; (OT)-Operational Training; (K)-Auxiliary; (AC)-Army Co-operation
 British Commonwealth Air Training Plan (BCATP)
 Bombing and Gunnery Schools
 No. 1 B&G School - Jarvis, Ontario, Used Bolingbroke IVT (Aug 40 – Feb 45)
 No. 2 B&G School - Mossbank, Saskatchewan, Used Bolingbroke IVT (Oct 40 – Dec 44)
 No. 3 B&G School - Macdonald, Manitoba, Used Anson, Battle, Bolingbroke IVT and Lysander, (Mar 41 – Feb 45)
 No. 4 B&G School - Fingal, Ontario, Used Bolingbroke IVT (Nov 40 – Feb 45)
 No. 5 B&G School - Dafoe, Saskatchewan, Used Bolingbroke IVT (Apr 41 – Feb 45)
 No. 6 B&G School - Mountain View, Ontario, Used Bolingbroke IVT (Jun 41 – Post War)
 No. 7 B&G School - Paulson, Manitoba, Used Bolingbroke IVT (Jun 41 – Feb 45)
 No. 8 B&G School - Lethbridge, Alberta, Used Bolingbroke IVT (Oct 41 – Dec 44)
 No. 9 B&G School - Mont-Joli, Quebec, Used Bolingbroke IVT (Dec 41 – Apr 45)
 No. 10 B&G School - Mount Pleasant, Prince Edward Island, Used Bolingbroke IVT (Sep 43 - Jun 45)
 No. 31 B&G School (RAF) - Picton, Ontario, Used Bolingbroke IVT (Apr 41 - Nov 44)  — currently Picton Airport

Surviving aircraft

Belgium
 9895 – Mk. IVT on static display at the Royal Museum of the Armed Forces and of Military History in Brussels. It includes parts from 10038.

Canada
 9059 – Mk. IV on static display at the Commonwealth Air Training Plan Museum in Brandon, Manitoba.
 9869 – Mk. IVT in storage at the Royal Aviation Museum of Western Canada in Winnipeg, Manitoba.
 9887 – Mk. IV under restoration to static condition at 17 Wing Winnipeg in Winnipeg, Manitoba. It was donated from a farm in 2013.
 9892 – Mk. IVT on static display at the Canada Aviation and Space Museum in Ottawa, Ontario.
 9904 – Mk. IVT in storage at the Reynolds-Alberta Museum in Wetaskiwin, Alberta.
 9944 – Mk. IVT on static display with the Commonwealth Air Training Plan Museum in Brandon, Manitoba. This aircraft is displayed next to the Trans-Canada Highway in Brandon.
 9987 – Mk. IV on static display at the Bomber Command Museum of Canada in Nanton, Alberta.
 9997 – Mk. IVT under restoration to static display at the Greenwood Military Aviation Museum in Greenwood, Nova Scotia.
 Composite – Mk. IV on static display at the British Columbia Aviation Museum in Victoria, British Columbia. It is a combination of two different airframes.
 Composite – Mk. IVT under restoration to ground running condition at the Canadian Warplane Heritage Museum in Hamilton, Ontario. It is a combination of eight different airframes.
 Unknown ID – Mk. IV under restoration to static display at the Canadian Aviation Heritage Centre in Sainte-Anne-de-Bellevue, Quebec.

United Kingdom
 9048 – Mk. IV under restoration to static display at Aerospace Bristol in Filton, Gloucestershire.
 9940 – Mk. IVT on static display at the National Museum of Flight in East Fortune, East Lothian. It uses the outer wings of 9059.
 10001 – Mk. IVT on static display at the Royal Air Force Museum London in London. It has been restored as a Blenheim and is painted as L8756 "XD-E" of 139 Squadron RAF.
 10038 – Mk. IVT in storage at Duxford Airfield in Duxford, Cambridgeshire. It was severely damaged in a crash in Denham Aerodrome on 21 June 1987.
 10201 – Mk. IVT airworthy with the Aircraft Restoration Company in Duxford, Cambridgeshire. It was restored using a Blenheim Mk I nose which had previously been converted to a car. It is registered as G-BPIV.

United States
 9983 – Mk. IVT in storage at Fantasy of Flight in Polk City, Florida.
 10076 – Mk. IV on static display at the Pima Air & Space Museum in Tucson, Arizona.

Specifications (Bolingbroke Mk IV)

See also

References
Notes

Bibliography

 Clark, R Wallace. British Aircraft Armament Volume 1: RAF Gun Turrets from 1914 to the Present Day. Patrick Spephens Ltd, 1993
 Green, William. War Planes of the Second World War: Volume Six Floatplanes. London:Macdonald, 1962.
 Green, William. War Planes of the Second World War: Volume Seven Bombers and Reconnaissance Aircraft. London: Macdonald, 1967.
 Griffin, J.A. Canadian Military Aircraft Serials & Photographs 1920 - 1968. Ottawa: Queen's Printer, Publication No. 69-2, 1969.
 Kostenuk, S. and J. Griffin. RCAF Squadron Histories and Aircraft: 1924–1968. Toronto: Samuel Stevens, Hakkert & Company, 1977. .
 Molson, Ken M. and Harold A. Taylor. Canadian Aircraft Since 1909. Stittsville, Ontario: Canada's Wings, Inc., 1982. .
 Mondey, David. The Hamlyn Concise Guide to American Aircraft of World War II. London: Aerospace Publishing Ltd, 1996. .
 Vincent, Carl Canadian Aircraft of WWII (AviaDossier No. 1). Kitchener, Ontario: SkyGrid, 2009. .

External links

 Canadian Warplane Heritage Bolingbroke restoration in Hamilton, ON
 CAHC Bolingbroke restoration in Montreal, QC
 Greenwood Military Air Museum Bolingbroke IV restoration in Nova Scotia
 The Nanton Lancaster Society Air Museum Bolingbroke IV
 British Columbia Aviation Museum Bolingbroke IV
 Pima Air & Space Museum Bolingbroke IV
 The Bristol Aero Collection Bolingbroke 9048 Restoration Project

Bolingbroke
1930s British bomber aircraft
1930s Canadian bomber aircraft
Fairchild aircraft
World War II British patrol aircraft
Mid-wing aircraft
Aircraft first flown in 1939
Twin piston-engined tractor aircraft